The Raschpëtzer Qanat is located NE of Helmsange in the commune of Walferdange, 10 km north of the City of Luxembourg. A qanat is an underground water management system consisting of vertical shafts connecting to a sloping tunnel designed to provide a supply of fresh water.

The Raschpëtzer is a particularly well preserved example of a qanat and is probably the most extensive system of its kind north of the Alps. It has been under systematic excavation for the past 40 years. To date some 330 m of the total tunnel length of 600 m have been explored. Thirteen of the 20 to 25 shafts have been discovered.

The qanat appears to have provided water for a large Roman villa on the slopes of the Alzette valley. It was built during the Gallo-Roman period, probably around the year 150 and functioned for about 120 years thereafter.

Footnotes 

Roman sites in Luxembourg
Roman aqueducts outside Rome
Persian developed underground aqueducts